Robert K. Tanaka (born 11 January 2000) is a Paralympic judoka, he is a Pan Am bronze medalist and he is competing in the 2020 Summer Paralympics in Tokyo.

References

2000 births
Living people
Sportspeople from Denver
American male judoka
Paralympic judoka of the United States
People with albinism
University of Southern California alumni